Payson-Seymour High School is a rural high school (grades 7–12) in Payson, Adams County, Illinois.

The ethnicity of the student population is 98% White, non-Hispanic and 2% two or more races.

Sports
The school has several sports teams.  The sports that the school offers are:

Fall:
Boys & Girls Golf
Volleyball
Co-Op Football

Winter:
Boys & Girls Basketball
Cheerleading
Dance

Spring:
Baseball
Softball
Track

References

External links
School Website
Payson Community Unit School District 1

Schools in Adams County, Illinois
Public high schools in Illinois
Payson, Illinois
Public middle schools in Illinois